Sozialistische Volkszeitung ('Socialist People's Newspaper') was a communist newspaper published from Frankfurt am Main, West Germany. It was an organ of the Communist Party of Germany. It was published daily (except Sundays) between August 1, 1949, and August 17, 1956.

References

German-language newspapers
Daily newspapers published in Germany
Communist newspapers
Communist Party of Germany
Mass media in Frankfurt